These are the Billboard magazine Hot 100 number one hits of 1974.

That year, 25 acts earn their first number one song, such as Steve Miller Band, Al Wilson, Barbra Streisand, Love Unlimited Orchestra, Terry Jacks, John Denver, Blue Swede, MFSB, The Three Degrees, Bo Donaldson and The Heywoods, Gordon Lightfoot, The Hues Corporation, George McCrae, Paper Lace, Odia Coates, Eric Clapton, Barry White, Andy Kim, Olivia Newton-John, Dionne Warwick, The Spinners, Bachman–Turner Overdrive, Billy Swan, Carl Douglas, and Harry Chapin. John Lennon, having already hit number one with The Beatles, earns his first number one song as a solo act. John Denver was the only act to have more than one song reach number one, with two.

1974 is tied with 1975 for scoring the most Hot 100 number ones, 35 each. The year would have more number ones than 1975, at 36, if including "Time in a Bottle" by Jim Croce, which initially topped the Hot 100 on December 29, 1973, and stayed atop the chart to start 1974.

Chart history

Number-one artists

See also
1974 in music
List of Cash Box Top 100 number-one singles of 1974

References

Sources
Fred Bronson's Billboard Book of Number 1 Hits, 5th Edition
Joel Whitburn's Top Pop Singles 1955-2008, 12 Edition
Joel Whitburn Presents the Billboard Hot 100 Charts: The Seventies
Additional information obtained can be verified within Billboard's online archive services and print editions of the magazine.

United States Hot 100
1974